Acleris busckana is a species of moth of the family Tortricidae. It is found in North America, where it has been recorded from Maine, Manitoba, Massachusetts, New Brunswick, New Hampshire, Ohio, Ontario, Quebec and West Virginia.

The wingspan is 20–22 mm for males and about 20 mm for females. The female forewings are light violet-grey, shaded with deeper purple-grey. There is a small black-brown patch at the base of the wing, shaded with light brown scaling, just beyond this is a smaller dark patch with brownish scaling and a dark scale-tuft. This patch is enclosed in a broad oblique band of the violet-grey ground colour, 
defined outwardly in the costal half and on the inner margin by a row of blackish dots. The terminal area of the wing is violet-grey with a few scattered black dots. Males have paler forewings, with the basal patch and costal triangle less obvious. The hindwings are very pale smoky, but somewhat darker apically. Adults have been recorded on wing from March to November.

The larvae feed on Spiraea species (including Spiraea alba).

References

Moths described in 1934
busckana
Moths of North America